Trichocentrum bicallosum is a species of orchid found from Mexico (Oaxaca, Chiapas) to Central America.

References

External links 

bicallosum
Orchids of Central America
Orchids of Chiapas
Flora of Oaxaca